Bangaru Manishi is a 1976 Indian Telugu-language drama film co-written and directed by A. Bhimsingh. It stars N. T. Rama Rao, Lakshmi and Hema Choudhary, with music composed by K. V. Mahadevan.

Cast

 N. T. Rama Rao as Venu
 Lakshmi as Geetha
 Hema Chaudhary as Padma
 Gummadi as Ranganna
 Prabhakar Reddy as Bhanoji Rao
 Sridhar as Prasad
 Sarath Babu as Madhu
 Allu Ramalingaiah as Bhaja Govindam
 Rao Gopal Rao as Satyam
 Pandari Bai as Seeta
 Mikkilineni as Chandra Shekaram
 Rama Prabha as Venkaiamma
 Nirmalamma as Lachamma
 Mukkamala as Collector
 Sukumari as Shanta Devi
 P. J. Sarma as P.A.
 Girija as Ramamani
 Chalapathi Rao as Damodaram
 Jagga Rao as Punyalu
 Potti Prasad
 K. V. Chalam

Soundtrack

Music composed by K. V. Mahadevan.

References

External links
 

1970s Telugu-language films
Films directed by A. Bhimsingh
Films scored by K. V. Mahadevan
Indian drama films